Somali Energy Company (SECO) is a private energy firm based in Mogadishu, Somalia. It specializes in the generation, transmission and distribution of electric power to residents and businesses within its service area in the south-central Banaadir region. The largest such energy company in the nation, it also engages in technical innovation of power systems, environmental technology and transmission systems.

See also
Somali Chamber of Commerce and Industry

References

Electric power companies of Somalia
Companies based in Mogadishu